North Muskegon is a city in Muskegon County in the U.S. state of Michigan. The population was 3,786 at the 2010 census.

Geography

Demographics

2010 census
As of the census of 2010, there were 3,786 people, 1,621 households, and 1,069 families living in the city. The racial makeup of the city was 94.6% White, 2.1% African American, 0.6% Native American, 0.7% Asian, 0.1% Pacific Islander, 0.2% from other races, and 1.8% from two or more races. Hispanic or Latino of any race were 2.4% of the population.

There were 1,621 households, of which 29.2% had children under the age of 18 living with them, 51.9% were married couples living together, 11.4% had a female householder with no husband present, 2.7% had a male householder with no wife present, and 34.1% were non-families. 30.0% of all households were made up of individuals, and 16.6% had someone living alone who was 65 years of age or older. The average household size was 2.30 and the average family size was 2.84.

The median age in the city was 45 years. 22.7% of residents were under the age of 18; 7.3% were between the ages of 18 and 24; 20% were from 25 to 44; 29.4% were from 45 to 64; and 20.6% were 65 years of age or older. The gender makeup of the city was 46.7% male and 53.3% female.

2000 census
As of the census of 2000, there were 4,031 people, 1,610 households, and 1,135 families living in the city. The racial makeup of the city was 97.22% White, 1.02% African American, 0.20% Native American, 0.37% Asian, 0.02% Pacific Islander, 0.35% from other races, and 0.82% from two or more races. Hispanic or Latino of any race were 1.31% of the population.

There were 1,610 households, out of which 31.7% had children under the age of 18 living with them, 58.1% were married couples living together, 8.9% had a female householder with no husband present, and 29.5% were non-families. 26.8% of all households were made up of individuals, and 13.6% had someone living alone who was 65 years of age or older.  The average household size was 2.41 and the average family size was 2.92.

In the city, the population was spread out, with 24.9% under the age of 18, 5.8% from 18 to 24, 23.4% from 25 to 44, 25.9% from 45 to 64, and 20.1% who were 65 years of age or older.  The median age was 43 years. For every 100 females, there were 90.7 males.  For every 100 females age 18 and over, there were 86.3 males.

The median income for a household in the city was $55,063, and the median income for a family was $63,819. Males had a median income of $47,681 versus $31,695 for females. The per capita income for the city was $27,140.  About 1.9% of families and 3.4% of the population were below the poverty line, including 3.9% of those under age 18 and 3.7% of those age 65 or over.

References

External links

City of North Muskegon web site

Cities in Muskegon County, Michigan